Yuliana is a feminine given name. People with the name include:

 Yuliana Doncheva (born 1965), Bulgarian politician, businesswoman and television personality
 Yuliana Fedak (born 1983), Ukrainian retired tennis player
 Yuliana Glinka (1844–1918), Russian occultist
 Yuliana Marinova (born 1967), Bulgarian retired sprinter
 Yuliana Peniche (born 1981), Mexican actress
 Yuliana Pérez (born 1981), American triple jumper
 Yuliana Salakhova born 1984), Russian sprint canoer

See also
 Yuliana Maldonado (born 2010),Pianist 
 Yuliyana Plevnelieva (born 1975), Bulgarian journalist and First Lady of Bulgaria from 2012 until 2017
 , a given name
 Juliana, a given name
 Iuliana, a given name
 Uliana, a list of people named Uliana or Ulyana

Feminine given names
Russian feminine given names
Ukrainian feminine given names
Bulgarian feminine given names
Spanish feminine given names